Kiatak or Northumberland Island, also known as Kujata, is an island off the coast of northern Greenland.

Geography
This relatively large island is part of a small group formed by Kiatak, Herbert Island and Hakluyt Island. 
The latter is the smallest of the group and lies off Kiatak's western shore. The islands lie off the Inglefield Fjord, between the Murchison Sound to the north and the Hvalsund to the south.

Important Bird Area
The island has been designated an Important Bird Area (IBA) by BirdLife International because it supports a breeding population of some 2.5 million pairs of little auks, as well as other seabird species.

History
The island was inhabited at the time of Robert Peary's Greenland expeditions in 1886 and 1891–1897.

See also
List of islands of Greenland

Bibliography
  Book Viewer

References

Islands of Greenland
Former populated places in Greenland
Important Bird Areas of Greenland
Important Bird Areas of Arctic islands
Seabird colonies